Jonê can refer to
Jonê County, an administrative district in the Gannan Tibetan Autonomous Prefecture, Gansu Province, China
Chone Monastery,  Jonê Monastery, a major Tibetan Geluk monastery in Jonê County